Walton & Hersham Football Club is a semi-professional football club based in Walton-on-Thames, Surrey. The club is affiliated to the Surrey County Football Association.

The club joined the Corinthian League upon formation, and after a difficult first season won three consecutive league titles. In 1950, the club moved to the Athenian League, and were later placed in the Premier Division upon expansion in 1963. Walton & Hersham were named league champions for a fourth time during the 1968–69 season, and shortly after joined the Isthmian League. The club's most successful period soon followed, which saw them reach the FA Cup Second Round and win the FA Amateur Cup at Wembley Stadium, although the departure of manager Allen Batsford and several players to Wimbledon saw the club quickly relegated to the Isthmian League Division Two.

After coming close to extinction in the late 1970s, former Ballon d'Or winner Sir Stanley Matthews was briefly named as president and the club later managed to find consistency throughout the 1980s. The Swans regularly earned promotion and suffered relegation between the Isthmian League divisions throughout the next decades, and named Millwall chairman Theo Paphitis as a board member for several years. Following the 2015–16 season, the club suffered relegation to the Combined Counties Premier Division and began to struggle once again.

In August 2017, Walton & Hersham left Stompond Lane and moved into the Elmbridge Sports Hub – a £20 million sports complex development shared with local rivals Walton Casuals. After three seasons in the ninth tier of English football, the club suffered further relegation to the Combined Counties Division One and long-term owner Alan Smith stepped down from his position. In July 2019, the club was taken over by a group of students, who claim to be the youngest owners in world football.

Walton & Hersham are the inspiration behind the name of punk band Sham 69, which was derived from a piece of graffiti reading 'Walton & Hersham 69'.

History

1945–1963 
Discussions of the amalgamation of local rivals Walton FC and Hersham FC took place as early as 1912, but the idea was rejected by membership vote. A second vote took place 11 years later, but with a tied decision the club remained separate, and the idea was once again rejected in 1933. However, when Hersham FC no longer had a home ground in 1945, the two clubs met again and came to an agreement to join the newly founded Corinthian League as one club.

Despite a poor first season, Walton & Hersham won the league three consecutive times from 1946 to 1949. They also won the Surrey Senior Cup for the first time during the 1947–48 season with a 2–1 win against Kingstonian at Crystal Palace. In 1950, the club were elected to the Athenian League and finished runners up in their debut season while also winning their second Surrey Senior Cup.

Walton & Hersham reached the FA Amateur Cup semi-finals in both the 1951–52 and 1952–53 seasons, and during this period gained a substantial following. The club reached the FA Cup First Round for the first time in 1957–58, losing 6–1 to Southampton in front of 6,000 people. They won the Surrey Senior Cup for a third time in 1960–61, and retained the trophy the following year.

1963–1994
The Athenian League expanded in 1963 and Walton & Hersham were placed in the Premier Division. A period of mid-table football followed until the 1967 appointment of Allen Batsford as manager heralded a new era of success. In 1968–69 he won the Athenian League, followed by two successive visits to the FA Cup First Round in 1969–70 and 1970–71. The Surrey Senior Cup was won again in 1970–71.

Walton & Hersham were elected to the Isthmian League in 1971, and the 1972–73 season proved statistically their greatest ever. They won the Surrey Senior Cup, finished as runners-up in the league, reached the FA Cup Second Round for the first time and, most prestigiously, won the FA Amateur Cup, defeating Slough Town at Wembley Stadium. They set a unique record by winning the competition without conceding a goal. Players including Dave Bassett, Willie Smith and Roger Connell became regulars in the England amateur international team. As FA Amateur Cup Winners they were invited to compete in the 1973 Final of The Coppa Ottorino Barassi (The Barassi Cup). They played Jesolo the Italian Amamtuer Cup Winners. The Swans won both legs 4–0 at home and 2-0 Away to lift the trophy. In 1973–74, the club reached the FA Cup Second Round again, having beaten Brian Clough's Brighton & Hove Albion at Goldstone Ground 4–0. Following the defeat, Clough almost got into a fight with comedian Eric Sykes, who was associated with Walton & Hersham at the time and was laughing about the result to a friend during a phone call.

In 1974, Batsford left to manage Wimbledon and took several players with him. Walton & Hersham were relegated in 1975 and, although they reached the FA Cup First Round again in the 1975–76 season, they went close to extinction in the late 1970s. They inspired the name of punk band Sham 69 (who formed in 1976), as they derived it from a piece of graffiti which read 'Walton & Hersham 69'. Despite briefly having Sir Stanley Matthews as president, the club endured a lean period throughout the 1980s.

1994–2018
Walton & Hersham were promoted to the Isthmian top flight in 1994, and reached the FA Cup First Round again that season, although relegation followed in 1996. They were promoted the following year, but relegation followed again in 2000. After a spell in the Isthmian League First Division, they appointed long-serving player Alan Dowson as manager and he led them to a successful 2004–05 season, with promotion secured as runners-up.

After the resignation of Alan Dowson in October 2006, former Gillingham first-team coach Bobby Paterson took over after a long search for a new manager. Walton & Hersham were relegated that season and Paterson's contract was terminated. The assistant manager Les Cleevely - the former Carshalton Athletic player/assistant manager for whom he made over 500 appearances - took over.

Former Millwall chairman Theo Paphitis became a member of Walton & Hersham's board of directors, and after a mid-table finish to the 2007–08 season, Les Cleevely became the academy coach while Jimmy Bolton took over as manager. In March 2009, Jimmy Bolton was replaced for the rest of the season by Matt Elverson as caretaker manager. During the 2009 off-season, John Crumplin was appointed manager, although his reign only lasted until September 2010. Chuck Martini was appointed soon after.

At the end of the 2015–16 season Walton & Hersham were relegated to the Combined Counties Football League Premier Division. The club appointed Simon Haughney as first team manager on 22 June 2016, with former Guyana international Howard Newton as assistant manager.

2019-
In June 2019 - after a season ending in relegation to the Combined Counties League One - the club was taken over by a consortium of seven young people; Thomas Bradbury, Reme Edetanlen, Jack Newton, Sartej Tucker, Ben Madelin, Calogero Scannella and Stephan Karidis. They got off to a winning start in the league with a 3–0 victory over Eversley & California FC.

Media coverage has been a prominent strategy for the new ownership, with national & international coverage documenting the club's direction as the unverified "youngest owners in world football". The new directors also featured in a 90min documentary that recorded their experiences, filmed during their first season in charge.

On April 14, 2020, Manager George Busumbru stepped down, citing 'personal reasons'. Scott Harris, former player & former assistant coach at Walton Casuals, replaced George.

In 2021 the club were promoted to the Premier Division South based on their results in the abandoned 2019–20 and 2020–21 seasons. After six years away from the Isthmian League, a 1–0 victory over Raynes Park Vale on 9 April 2022 secured at least a second placed spot and back-to-back promotions. The club returned to Step 4 for the first time since relegation in 15/16.

Stadium
Walton & Hersham play their home games at the Elmbridge Sports Hub, Waterside Drive, Walton-on-Thames, Surrey, KT12 2JP.

The club moved into the stadium for the 2017–18 season following a two-year, £20 million redevelopment on the site of the former Waterside Stadium. The stadium was shared with Walton Casuals until they folded, as well as the local athletics club with an eight-lane Olympic standard athletics track located behind the main stand and clubhouse of the football stadium.

The club have spent much of their history at Stompond Lane, where they began playing upon formation in 1945. The Swans notably hosted Southampton in a 6–1 defeat in the 1957–58 FA Cup First Round and earned a 0–0 draw against Brighton & Hove Albion in the 1973–74 FA Cup edition. In 2017, the stadium was demolished to make way for new housing developments as the club moved across town.

Players and staff

Current squad

Coaching staff
As of 16th August 2022.

Achievements
League
Athenian League
Winners: 1968–69
Runners-up (3): 1950–51, 1969–70, 1970–71
Corinthian League
Winners (3): 1946–47, 1947–48, 1948–49
Runners-up: 1949–50
Isthmian League
Winners: 1972–73
Division One
Runners-up: 2004–05
Third place (2): 1993–94, 1996–97
Combined Counties Football League
Premier Division South 
Runners Up: 2021-22
Division One
Runners Up: 2020-21

 Cup
 FA Amateur Cup
 Winners: 1972–73
 Barassi Cup
 Winners: 1973–74
 CCL Premier Challenge Cup 
Winners: 2021-22 
 London Senior Cup
 Runners-up: 1973–74
 Surrey Senior Cup
 Winners (6): 1947–48, 1950–51, 1960–61, 1961–62, 1970–71, 1972–73
 Runners-up (6): 1951–52, 1959–60, 1969–70, 1971–72, 1973–74, 2004–05

Records

Matches 

 First competitive match: Epsom Town 7–1 Walton & Hersham, Corinthian League, 1 September 1945
 First FA Cup match: Walton & Hersham 11–0 Epsom Town, First Qualifying Round, 22 September 1945
 First FA Amateur Cup match: Walton & Hersham 6–0 Stoke Recreation, Second Qualifying Round, 13 October 1945
 First Surrey Senior Cup match: Walton & Hersham 2–3 Tooting & Mitcham United, First Round, 1 December 1945
 First London Senior Cup match: Walton & Hersham 1–0 Leatherhead, First Qualifying Round, 22 September 1973
 First FA Trophy match: Tooting & Mitcham United 3–0 Walton & Hersham, Third Qualifying Round, 30 November 1974 
 First Barassi Cup match: Walton & Hersham 4–0 AC Jesolo, First Leg, 18 October 1973
 First Isthmian League Cup match: Walton & Hersham 3–4 Chesham United, First Round, 9 March 1976
 First Full Members' Cup match: Staines Town 1–5 Walton & Hersham, First Round, 18 December 1990
 First FA Vase match: Frimley Green 0–3 Walton & Hersham, Second Qualifying Round, 24 September 2016
 First Combined Counties Premier Challenge Cup match: Walton & Hersham 5–1 Eversley & California, Second Round, 1 November 2016
 Record attendance: 10,000 (v Crook Town, FA Amateur Cup Fourth Round, 1955)

Results 

 Record win:
 11–0 v Epsom Town, FA Cup First Qualifying Round, 22 September 1945
 11–0 v Redhill, FA Amateur Cup Fourth Qualifying Round, 10 November 1945
 11–0 v Guildford, FA Cup Preliminary Round, 21 September 1946
 Record defeat:
 0–7 v Farnborough Town, Isthmian League Division One, 18 September 1984
 0–7 v Kingstonian, Isthmian League Premier Division, 14 March 1998
 0–7 v Chelmsford City, Isthmian League Premier Division, 17 February 2007
 1–8 v Dagenham, Isthmian League Division One, 21 December 1974
 1–8 v Kingstonian, Surrey Senior Cup First Round, 1 January 1990
 2–9 v Enfield, Athenian League, 13 February 1960
 2–9 v Bromley, FA Cup Fourth Qualifying Round, 6 November 1976
 Highest scoring game:
 9–3 v Camberley Town, FA Amateur Cup, 26 October 1946
 9–3 v Bedford Avenue, Corinthian League, 19 April 1947
 9–3 v Hornchurch & Upminster, Corinthian League, 28 January 1961
 11–1 v Twickenham, FA Cup Preliminary Round, 18 September 1948

Competitions 

 Corinthian League best performance: 1st, 1946–47, 1947–48, 1948–49
 Athenian League best performance: 1st – Premier Division, 1968–69
 Isthmian League best performance: 2nd, 1973–74
 Combined Counties League best performance: 2nd – Premier Division South, 2021-22
 FA Amateur Cup best performance: Winners, 1972–73
 FA Cup best performance: Second round, 1972–73, 1973–74
 FA Trophy best performance: Fourth round, 2004–05
 FA Vase best performance: Fourth round, 2020–21
 London Senior Cup best performance: Runners-up, 1973–74
 Surrey Senior Cup best performance: Winners, 1947–48, 1950–51, 1960–61, 1961–62, 1970–71,1972–73

Former players 

 Players that have played/managed in the football league or any foreign equivalent to this level (i.e. fully professional league).
 Players with full international caps.

  Timi Alexander
  Doug Allder
  Ed Asafu-Adjaye
  Moses Ashikodi
  Laurience Batty
  Derek Bryan
  Jeff Bryant
  Casey Castle
  Tim Clancy
  Jack Cock
  Roger Connell
  Neil Cordice
  Ivailo Dimitrov
  Dave Donaldson
  Alan Dowson
  Andy Driscoll
  Billy Edwards
  Nathan Ellington
  Sander smets
  Marvin Farrell
  Mark Fiore
  Akwasi Fobi-Edusei
  Daniel Francis
  Joe Gadston
  Abdeen Temitope Abdul
  Alan Gane
  Peter Gelson
  Nick Gindre
  Byron Glasgow
  Michael Gordon
  Alan Hawley
  Garry Haylock
  Mick Heath
  Gavin Holligan
  Joe Howe
  Gus Hurdle
  Gary Johnson
  Francis Joseph
  Calum Kitscha
  Gary MacDonald
  Stuart Massey
  Chris McClaren
  Andrew McCulloch
  Mark McLeod
  Alan Morton
  Kieran Murphy
  Mick Murphy
  Jack Neale
  Howard Newton
  Mark Nwokeji
  Roy Odiaka
  Dennis Pacey
  Richard Pacquette
  Steve Parsons
  Mark Peters
  Neil Price
  Paul Priddy
  Bas Savage
  Andy Sayer
  Andre Scarlett
  Claude Stephane Seanla
  Chris Sharpling
  Jean-Michel Sigere
  Paul Smith
  Matt Somner
  Tim Soutar
  Aryan Tajbakhsh
  Dave Tarpey
  Richard Teale
  Steve Terry
  Dan Thompson
  Bobby Traynor
  Graham Westley
  Stephen Wilkins
  Tom Williams
  Bobby Wilson

See also
List of Walton & Hersham F.C. seasons

References

External links
Official website

 
Isthmian League
Association football clubs established in 1945
Corinthian League (football)
Athenian League
Football clubs in Surrey
1945 establishments in England
Football clubs in England

el:Γουόλτον-ον-Τέιμς#Γουόλτον και Χέρσαμ ΦΚ